Garfield Heights is a neighborhood in Pasadena, California. The original tract name registered with the city of Pasadena in 1904. In 1998, the area was designated a landmark district. It is bordered by Washington Boulevard to the north, Mountain Street to the south, North Marengo Avenue to the west, and Los Robles Avenue to the east.

Architecture
The neighborhood contains one of the city's oldest intact neighborhoods featuring a variety of architectural styles ranging from Queen Anne to Spanish Revival. Many of the era's architects built homes here including Meyer & Holler, Greene and Greene and Sylvanus Marston.

Los Angeles magazine referred to the neighborhood as "Pasadena's very well kept little secret".

Education
Garfield Heights is served by Washington Elementary, Washington Middle, and John Muir High School.

Transportation
The neighborhood is served by Metro Local lines 256, 660 and 662; and Pasadena Transit routes 20, 31 and 32.

References

Neighborhoods in Pasadena, California